The 1990–91 Football League season was Birmingham City Football Club's 88th in the Football League and their second in the Third Division. They finished in 12th position in the 24-team division, their lowest finish ever in the Football League. They entered the 1990–91 FA Cup in the first round proper and lost to Brentford in the second, and entered at and lost in the first round of the League Cup, beaten over two legs by AFC Bournemouth. They won the Associate Members' Cup, a cup competition open to clubs in the third and fourth tiers of the English football league system, defeating Tranmere Rovers 3–2 in the final at Wembley Stadium with goals from Simon Sturridge and two from John Gayle.

Off the field, Dave Mackay resigned as manager in January 1991, to be replaced by Lou Macari on a non-contract basis. With the club in financial difficulties, Macari and his staff walked out of the club in June to join Stoke City. Many of the playing staff were out of contract and reluctant to renew, and an action group was formed to try to remove the chairman.

Football League Third Division

League table (part)

FA Cup

League Cup

Associate Members' Cup

Appearances and goals

Numbers in parentheses denote appearances as substitute.
Players with name struck through and marked  left the club during the playing season.
Players with names in italics and marked * were on loan from another club for the whole of their season with Birmingham.

See also
Birmingham City F.C. seasons

References
General
 
 
 Source for match dates, league positions and results: 
 Source for lineups, appearances, goalscorers and attendances: Matthews (2010), Complete Record, pp. 416–17, 480.

Specific

Birmingham City F.C. seasons
Birmingham City